Everything Comes and Goes is an EP by Michelle Branch, released to her official website on July 16, 2010, and was released at iTunes on August 27, 2010.

The EP was recorded at Starstruck Studios, Soundstage Studios, and Nashville Noise in Nashville, Tennessee as well as Henson Studios in Hollywood, California and New York Noise, from 2008 to 2009. The EP was dubbed as a 'bonus album' by the singer herself. It spawned one single, "Sooner or Later" which became a minor commercial hit, peaking at #93 on the US Billboard Hot 100 and #46 on the US Billboard Hot Country Songs chart.  Everything Comes and Goes was intended to be released as a full album consisting of 13 tracks, including a duet with Dwight Yoakam on a song titled "Long Goodbye".  However, due to changes at Warner Bros. Records, the album's release date was pushed back multiple times and ultimately was released as an EP.  Several intended album tracks from the original record, including "Long Goodbye", "Texas In The Mirror" and "Take a Chance On Me", were later released individually as free downloads for a limited amount of time. On a live webchat to fans on May 26, 2011, Branch revealed a previously unreleased track from Everything Comes and Goes, "Through the Radio" would be included on her new studio album West Coast Time as a hidden track - however, the album remains unreleased due to label issues.  Other tracks from the recording sessions that did not make the final cut for this album were "I'm Not Gonna Follow You Home" and "Just Let Me In".

Critical reception

Development
After the release of her second studio album, Hotel Paper, Branch's solo career came to a halt while she focused on the band The Wreckers. The group split in 2007. In October 2007, Branch announced that she was working on a new solo album and later reported the title would be Everything Comes and Goes. The album was reported to have embraced more country essences than her previous releases. In June 2008, she played several live shows in preparation for the album's release with her sister Nicole singing backing vocals. During the recording sessions for Everything Comes and Goes, Branch recorded many tracks, some that were not included on the final six-track EP. These included songs called "Jack And Jim", "Carry Me, "Pretty Little Lyin' Eyes" and "Through the Radio". After problems at her record label caused severe delays in the release of the album, Branch released the project as a six-track EP on July 16, 2010.  Three songs from the sessions, "Take A Chance On Me", "Texas In The Mirror" and "Long Goodbye," were later released as limited time free downloads from the singer's website.

Singles
"Sooner or Later" was released on June 29, 2009, as the lead single from Everything Comes and Goes. Musically, the song is a moderate up-tempo country song driven by acoustic guitar, with prominent banjo and steel guitar fills and was written by Branch along with John Shanks and Hillary Lindsey. It was a minor commercial hit, peaking at 93 in the US Billboard Hot 100. A music video for "Sooner or Later" directed by Liz Friedlander, premiered during CMT's Big New Music Weekend on October 2, 2009.

A track called "This Way" was intended to be included on the full-length album as the lead single. A music video directed by Raphael Mazucco was filmed, but "This Way" was not included on the six-track EP.

Track listing

Curiosities

'Texas in the Mirror' and a brand new song called 'What Don't Kill You' also known as 'What Don't Kill Ya' were included in the soundtrack of the 2013 film Tiger Eyes, starring Willa Holland.

Chart performance

Personnel
Michelle Branch – vocals, acoustic guitar
John Leventhal – guitar, bass guitar, Dobro, banjo, organ
John Shanks – guitar, bass guitar, keyboards
Greg Leisz – lap steel guitar, pedal steel guitar, guitars, mandolin
Larry Campbell – fiddle, steel guitar
Dan Dugmore – pedal steel guitar
Charles Judge – piano, B3
Teddy Landau – bass guitar
Abe Laboriel Jr. – drums
Shawn Pelton – drums
Jim Keltner – drums
Rick DePofi – percussion
Jeff Rothschild – drum programming
Hillary Lindsey – background vocals, harmony vocals

References

2010 debut EPs
Michelle Branch EPs
Albums produced by John Leventhal
Albums produced by John Shanks